Shippea Hill railway station is on the Breckland Line in the east of England, serving the Burnt Fen area of Cambridgeshire and Suffolk.

Shippea Hill is a request stop  from London Liverpool Street via Cambridge, in one of the few areas within Burnt Fen which rise just above sea level. The station is on the A1101 road between Littleport and Mildenhall.

It has been noted for its low patronage: for example, only 12 passenger entries/exits were recorded at the station in 2015/16.

History
The station was opened in 1845 as Mildenhall Road. In 1885 its name was changed to Burnt Fen, and in about 1904 it adopted the name Shippea Hill.

On 7 April 1906, a passenger train derailed due to excessive speed. Eight passengers were injured, two seriously.

Ordnance Survey maps from the 1920s show a network of narrow-gauge horse-drawn feeder agricultural tramways running south west from the station yard onto the Hiam Estate. There was also a standard gauge private railway branch running east to a chicory factory, which in turn had a network of narrow gauge agricultural tramways running south east onto the Chivers Estate.

On 3 December 1976, at about 4 pm, a passenger train collided with a lorry on an unmanned level crossing near Shippea Hill. The train driver, Robert (Bob) Hitcham, was killed and eight of his passengers were injured.

The wooden level crossing gates at Shippea Hill used to be operated manually by the signalman in the local signal box. In 2012, the signal box was closed and the crossing was renewed with automatic barriers and warning lights.

Quietest UK railway station

Shippea Hill has been recorded as one of the least-used railway stations in Britain. According to Office of Rail and Road estimates, it was the least-used railway station in 2014/15 (with 22 passengers) and 2015/16 (12 passengers). In 2016/17 there was an increase to 156 passengers. This trend has continued in subsequent years, to a recent record of 432 passengers in 2018/19. Due to its unusual status, it sometimes attracts attempts to boost its numbers. In December 2016, Ian Cumming, a finalist from The Great British Bake Off attracted at least 16 people to the station by handing out free mince pies.

Simon Usborne of The Guardian wrote, "It's hard to imagine a more desolate place to get off a train. Shipping containers for sale stand in a muddy yard behind the far platform, opposite the pitched-roof signal box, now shuttered. Otherwise the view is of field after field, some showing maize stumps, others now peat-black and ploughed."

Shippea Hill station was not always so quiet. The 1966/1967 timetable shows that about 12 trains a day called in each direction and it was used as a railhead for the airbases at Mildenhall and Lakenheath; many Americans boarded or left the train there.

Geoff Marshall and Vicki Pipe featured the station on their YouTube channel All The Stations, which catalogued their attempt to visit all currently operating railway stations in Great Britain. In Episode 17, on 3 June 2017, they started their day at Shippea Hill and, with a group of 19 friends plus three unrelated genuine passengers, they almost doubled the 12-passenger total from 2015/16 in one day.

Services
Shippea Hill is a request stop, so passengers must signal to the conductor or driver if they wish to alight or board.

, on weeekdays the station is served by one train per day (in the morning peak) to  departing at 07:26. On Saturdays there a service to Norwich departing at 07:47 and one train to  departing at 16:15. There is no Sunday service.

Despite the next station, Lakenheath, being only a few miles away, there are no direct services between the two stations.

References

External links

 

Railway stations in Cambridgeshire
DfT Category F2 stations
Former Great Eastern Railway stations
Railway stations in Great Britain opened in 1845
Greater Anglia franchise railway stations
Railway request stops in Great Britain
Low usage railway stations in the United Kingdom